And the Thieves Are Gone is an EP by Joseph Arthur released on December 7, 2004. The bulk of the EP was recorded in New Orleans where much of the album Our Shadows Will Remain was produced. And the Thieves Are Gone was made available primarily at select US indie music stores only. The song "Real as Rain" became the B-side to the "Can't Exist" single in 2005, and "Papa" became the B-side to the "Devil's Broom" single in 2006.

"My Home Is Your Head" appeared in the House M.D. episode "Ugly," which first aired on November 13, 2007.

Track listing

Credits
 Joseph Arthur: all instruments on all songs.

Joseph Arthur albums
2004 EPs
Vector Recordings albums